Honest is the soundtrack of the 2000 feature film Honest, directed by ex-Eurythmics member David A. Stewart.

Track listing

See also
 Honest (movie)
2000 soundtrack albums
Comedy film soundtracks
Crime film soundtracks